Hugh Russell (born 15 December 1959) is a former professional boxer from Northern Ireland who competed from 1981 to 1985. He held the British bantamweight title in 1983, and the British flyweight title from 1984 to 1985. As an amateur, he won bronze medals at the 1978 Commonwealth Games and the 1980 Summer Olympics, both in the flyweight division.

1980 Olympic results
Below are the results of Hugh Russell, an Irish flyweight boxer who competed at the 1980 Moscow Olympics:

 Round of 32: Defeated Samir Khiniab (Iraq) on points, 5-0
 Round of 16: Defeated Emmanuel Mlundwa (Tanzania) on points, 5-0
 Quarterfinal: Defeated Yo Ryon-Sik (North Korea) on points, 3-2
 Semifinal: Lost to Peter Lessov (Bulgaria) on points, 0-5 (was awarded bronze medal)

Professional career
Known as "Little Red", Russell turned pro in 1981 and won two British titles in Bantamweight and Flyweight. He was the first boxer to win a British title at both divisions in that order.

In October 1982 he defeated Davy Larmour at the Ulster Hall to win the Irish Bantamweight title. The fight was also a final eliminator for the British Bantamweight title.

An iconic image of Russell reaching through the ropes to kiss his mother, Eileen, after winning the fight, appears in photographer Brendan Murphy's book Eyewitness.

In January 1983, he fought in the last 15 round British title fight against reigning Bantamweight champion John Feeney. The fight was stopped in the 13th round when the referee disqualified Feeney.

Russell retired in 1985 as undefeated British flyweight champion after securing the Lonsdale Belt.

See also
 List of British bantamweight boxing champions
 List of British flyweight boxing champions

References
 

1959 births
Living people
Boxers at the 1980 Summer Olympics
Male boxers from Northern Ireland
Olympic boxers of Ireland
Olympic bronze medalists for Ireland
Boxers from Belfast
Boxers at the 1978 Commonwealth Games
Commonwealth Games bronze medallists for Northern Ireland
Olympic medalists in boxing
Irish male boxers
Medalists at the 1980 Summer Olympics
Commonwealth Games medallists in boxing
Bantamweight boxers
Medallists at the 1978 Commonwealth Games